Giovanni Lapentti won this tournament. He defeated Igor Kunitsyn 7–5, 6–3 in the final.

Seeds

Draw

Finals

Top half

Bottom half

References
 Main Draw
 Qualifying Draw

Seguros Bolivar Open San Jose - Singles